Bizkaiko Bira was a multi-day road cycling race held annually in Biscay, Spain. It was regarded as one of the  most prestigious amateur races in the world. Many winners became professional after winning the race including Erik Dekker, Roberto Heras, Igor González de Galdeano and Julián Gorospe.

The race started in 1981 and lasted until 2009. The organizer was the Amorebieta Txirrindulari Elkartea (Cyclist Association of Amorebieta). They also organize the Klasika Primavera cyclist race. In 2005 due to economical problems, they refused to organize the race and Iñaki Barrenetxea Giraldez, a former professional rider took over for the next years. The race was supported by El Correo local newspaper, BBK. In 2010 the race was permananetly canceled.

The first winner was the local cyclist Julián Gorospe. Hans Knauer won the race two consecutive years, 1983 and 1984.

Major results

References 

Cycle races in Spain
Sport in Biscay
Defunct cycling races in Spain
Cycle racing in the Basque Country (autonomous community)
Recurring sporting events established in 1981
Recurring sporting events disestablished in 2009